This is a list of lakes in the Ain department on the eastern edge of France.

 Lac de Barterand, a lake in Pollieu
 Lac de Chailloux, a small lake at Contrevoz
 Lac de Chavoley, a lake at Ceyzérieu
 Lac de Coiselet, a reservoir
 Lac de Conflans,  a lake at the confluence of the rivers Ain and Valouse
 Lacs de Conzieu, a group of three small lakes at Conzieu
 Lac de Crotel, a lake at Groslée
 Lac de Divonne, an artificial lake at Divonne-les-Bains
 Lac de Glandieu
 Lacs des Hôpitaux, a pair of lakes at La Burbanche
 Lac de Morgnieu, a lake at Ceyzérieu
 Lac de Nantua, a lake located between Nantua, Montreal-la-Cluse, and Port
 Lac de Sylans, a lake at Le Poizat
 Lac de Virieu, a lake at Virieu-le-Grand
 Lac Genin, a lake fed by underground sources